Antony Selvanayagam is the  Bishop Emeritus of the Diocese of Penang, Malaysia. He was elected by Pope John Paul II as the 4th bishop of Penang after the transfer of his predecessor, Bishop Anthony Soter Fernandez to the Archdiocese of Kuala Lumpur as the 2nd archbishop of Kuala Lumpur. From 1980–1983, he was an auxiliary bishop in the Archdiocese of Kuala Lumpur, holding the titular see of Giru Mons. He retired in 2012 due to old age, and was succeeded by Msgr. Sebastian Francis as the new Bishop of Penang.
He has served as head of the church's Commission for Ecumenism and Interreligious Affairs.

See also
 Archdiocese of Kuala Lumpur
 Diocese of Penang

External links

 Catholic-Hierarchy.org

References

1935 births
Malaysian people of Indian descent
20th-century Roman Catholic bishops in Malaysia
21st-century Roman Catholic bishops in Malaysia
Living people
People from Penang
Alumni of St. Patrick's College, Jaffna